Değirmenburnu Nature Park is a nature park in Istanbul Province, Turkey.

Nature park
Değirmenburnu (literally "Cape Mill") is situated north of Heybeliada in Adalar district southeast of Istanbul Province. Heybeliada is the second biggest of the Princes' Islands, a group of nine islands in the Sea of Marmara. An area north of the island was declared a nature park by the Ministry of Environment and Forest in 2011.

In addition to outdoor activity of hiking and swimming, the nature park offers phaeton riding and bike rental on daily basis. There is an outdoor coffeehouse in the park.

Historic buildings such as the Heybeliada Sanatorium, the Eastern Orthodox Church Theological School of Halki and a mill are interesting sites in the park area to visit.

Climate
The area's climate is also effected by Mediterranean climate. Summers are hot and dry, winters are mild and rainy. The temperature difference between night and day is little. Dominnat wind direction is northwest. The winds are effective in the year around, and strong winds blow in the northwest direction in February and June. Relative humidity does not fall below 70% even in June or July.

Ecosysten
Flora
The flora of the nature park mainly consists of Turkish pine (Pinus brutia), stone pine (Pinus pinea), maritime pine (Pinus pinaster), blackthorn (Prunus spinosa), bay laurel (Laurus nobilis), Mediterranean cypress (Cupressus sempervirens), southern magnolia (Magnolia grandiflora), Atlas cedar (Cedrus atlantica), Loquat (Eriobotrya japonica), Mediterranean hackberry (Celtis australis), Judas tree (Cercis siliquastrum), pink rock-rose (Cistus creticus), pink rock-rose (Cistus creticus), Spanish broom (Spartium junceum), common ivy (Hedera helix), Chinese photinia (Photinia serratifolia) and Sally-my-handsome (Carpobrotus acinaciformis).

Fauna
Animals observed in the nature park are the mammals squirrel, porcupine, hare, mole and the bird species magpie, passer and crow.

See also
Büyükada Nature Park, on the eastern part of the neighboring island Büyükada
Dilburnu Nature Park, on the western part of Büyükada

References

Nature parks in Turkey
Protected areas established in 2011
2011 establishments in Turkey
Parks in Istanbul
Adalar